WKXY is a radio station airing a country music format.  The station is licensed to Merigold, Mississippi and broadcasts on 92.1 MHz.  WKXY is owned by Delta Radio Network LLC. The WKXY studio is located at 3965 Highway 61 North in Cleveland, Mississippi, and the transmitter site is located on East Mound Bayou Road, near the town of Mound Bayou, Mississippi.

History 
WKXY originally went on-air in Clarksdale, Mississippi in 2003 and operated as a simulcast of WROX.  The city of license was changed to Merigold, Mississippi in 2008 and the station was moved to and began serving the Cleveland, Mississippi area in October 2008.

Programming 
The station features a mainstream country format, including the KIX morning show with John "Maddog" Miller.

References

External links

Country radio stations in the United States
KXY